Francisco Gorrissen (born 30 August 1994) is an Argentine rugby union player who plays for the Vannes. Previsously he played for Belgrano and the Jaguares.

References

External links
 itsrugby Profile

Jaguares (Super Rugby) players
Rugby union flankers
Argentine people of Norwegian descent
Argentine rugby union players
1994 births
Living people
Belgrano Athletic Club rugby union players
Argentina international rugby union players
Rugby Club Vannes players